Show Your Love Concert is a live video album by Taiwanese singer Jolin Tsai. It was released on May 10, 2001, by Universal and D Sound. It chronicled the Show Your Love Concert at Panchiao Stadium in Panchiao, Taiwan on February 25, 2001.

Background and release 
On December 22, 2000, Tsai released her third studio album, Show Your Love, which sold more than 280,000 copies in Taiwan. On February 25, 2001, she held the Show Your Love Concert at Panchiao Stadium in Panchiao, Taiwan. On March 4, 2001, she held the second Show Your Love Concert at the planned site of Fulfillment Amphitheater in Taichung, Taiwan.

On May 10, 2001, Tsai released the live video album, Show Your Love Concert, which chronicled the Show Your Love Concert at Panchiao Stadium in Panchiao, Taiwan.

Track listing

Release history

References 

2001 live albums
2001 video albums
Jolin Tsai live albums
Jolin Tsai video albums
Universal Music Taiwan live albums
Universal Music Taiwan video albums